was a Japanese freelance voice actor who was formerly affiliated with Kyu Production, 81 Produce, and D-COLOR. As a child, he wanted to be a physical education teacher before becoming a voice actor in 1987. The first role he auditioned for was Shutendouji in Ronin Warriors. He took over some of the roles from the late Yō Yoshimura and Kazuyuki Sogabe. His hobbies included driving and sports such as baseball, soccer, and karate.

On November 21, 2022, it was announced that Yanada died on November 14 at the age of 57.

Notable voice roles

Television animation
1980s
Jushin Liger (1989) – Ryu Dolk
1990s
Kyatto Ninden Teyandee (1990) – Rikinoshin
The Brave Fighter of Legend Da-Garn (1992) – Turbo Lander, Violeece
Slam Dunk (1993) – Takenori Akagi
Shippū! Iron Leaguer (1993) - Gold Arm
Captain Tsubasa J (1994) – Hiroshi Jito
Macross 7 (1994) – Barton
Magic Knight Rayearth (1994) – Geo Metro
Bonobono (1995) – Higuma no Taishō
Sorcerer Hunters (1995) – Gateau
Virtua Fighter (1995) – Kage-Maru
Dragonball GT (1996) – General Rildo
Yat Anshin Uchuu Ryokou (1996) – Kaoru Yamamoto
Pocket Monsters (1997) – Kaz Gym Leader, James' father
Bubblegum Crisis Tokyo 2040 (1998) – Leon McNichol
Fancy Lala (1998) – Narumi
Digimon Adventure (1999) – Andromon
2000s
Digimon Adventure 02 (2000) – Andromon
Inuyasha (2001) – Rōyankan
Digimon Tamers (2002) – Guardromon/Andromon
Digimon Frontier (2002) – Asuramon
Cromartie High School (2003) – Jackson Setouchi
Astro Boy (2003) – Harley
Transformers: Armada (2003) – Megatron
Rockman.EXE Axess (2003) – Desertman
Zatch Bell! (2003) – Baltro
Bleach (2004) – Tessai Tsukabishi, Baigon
Rockman.EXE Stream (2004) – Desertman, Takeo Inukai
SD Gundam Force (2004) – Cobramaru
Oh My Goddess! (2005) – Toraichi Tamiya
Black Lagoon (2006) – Ginji Matsuzaki
Code Geass (2006) – Andreas Darlton
Fist of the Blue Sky (2006) – Máng Kuáng-Yún
D.Gray-man (2007) – Noise Marie
Death Note (2007) – Takeshi Ooi
Tengen Toppa Gurren Lagann (2007) – Thymilph
Detective Conan (2008) – Andre Camel
Shin Mazinger Shougeki! Z Hen (2009) – Archduke Gorgon
Inuyasha: The Final Act (2009) – Bone demon's father
2010s
Digimon Xros Wars (2010) – AncientVolcamon
The Ambition of Oda Nobuna (2012) – Yoshitatsu Saitō
Hunter × Hunter (2011) - Todo, Tsezguerra
Berserk (2017) – Grunbeld
2020s
Getter Robo Arc (2021) – Benkei Kuruma
Boruto: Naruto Next Generations (2022) – Captain Taiki

Theatrical animation
The Heroic Legend of Arslan (1991) – Zande
Mobile Suit Gundam F91 (1991) – Zabine Chareux
Perfect Blue (1998) – Director

OVAs
Otaku no Video (1991) – Murata
Domain of Murder (1992) - Detective Shimizu
Oh My Goddess! (1993) - Toraichi Tamiya
Moldiver (1993) – Kaoru Misaki
After School in the Teacher's Lounge (1994) – Kazama Toshiaki
Fire Emblem (1995) – Gazak
Mutant Turtles: Choujin Densetsu-hen (1996) – Shredder
The King of Braves GaoGaiGar Final (2000) – Palparepa
New Getter Robo (2004) – Benkei Musashibô

Video games
Castlevania: Rondo of Blood (1993) – Shaft
Virtua Fighter 3 (1996) – Taka-Arashi
Lunar: Silver Star Story Complete (1996) – Ghaleon
Castlevania: Symphony of the Night (1997) – Richter Belmont and Shaft
JoJo's Bizarre Adventure (1998) – Jotaro Kujo
Inuyasha (2001) – Rōyakan
Z.O.E ~Zone of the Enders~ (2001) – Rock Thunderheart
Baten Kaitos: Eternal Wings and the Lost Ocean (2003) – Gibari
Rockman ZX (2006) – Serpent
Virtua Fighter 5 R/Final Showdown/Ultimate Showdowm (2007, 2010, 2021) – Taka-Arashi
Lunar: Silver Star Harmony (2009) – Ghaleon
Marvel vs. Capcom 3: Fate of Two Worlds / Ultimate Marvel vs. Capcom 3 (2011) – Mike Haggar
Berserk and the Band of the Hawk (2016) – Grunbeld
Street Fighter V (2016) – Mike Haggar
Super Smash Bros. Ultimate (2018) - Richter Belmont, Mii Fighters
Guilty Gear series (Xrd [2014, 2016], Strive [2021]) - Colin Vernon E. Groubitz

Tokusatsu
 Ninja Sentai Kakuranger (1994) – Amanojaku (ep. 33)
 Chouriki Sentai Ohranger Movie (1995) – Locker Knight
 Hyakujuu Sentai Gaoranger (2001) – Samurai Doll Org (ep. 11)
 Kamen Rider Agito (2001) – El of the Water (ep. 33 - 34, 41 - 43)
 Ninpu Sentai Hurricanger (2002) – Boss Tau Zanto (ep. 1 - 50)
 Ninpu Sentai Hurricaneger: Shushuuto the Movie (2002) - Boss Tau Zanto
 Ninpu Sentai Hurricaneger vs. Gaoranger (2003) - Boss Tau Zanto
 Abaranger vs. Hurricanger (2004) – Janin Iiga
 Kamen Rider Blade (2004) – Kamen Rider Leangle/Rebirth Spider Undead (ep. 17-42)
 Mahou Sentai Magiranger (2005) – Hades Beastman Beldan The Behemoth (ep. 24)
 Gougou Sentai Boukenger (2006) – Wicked Dragon Narga (ep. 15 - 16)
 Kamen Rider Den-O (2007) – Bat Imagin (ep. 1 - 2)
 Engine Sentai Go-onger (2008) – Land Pollution Minister Yogostein (eps 1 - 36) (voice), Crime Minister Yogoshimacritein (eps. 46 - 51) (voice), Joudo Toudori (ep. 51) (actor)
 Engine Sentai Go-onger: Boom Boom! Bang Bang! GekijōBang!! (2008) – Land Pollution Minister Yogostein, Ronin of Samurai Word
 Engine Sentai Go-onger vs. Gekiranger (2009) – Land Pollution Minister Yogostein
 Samurai Sentai Shinkenger vs. Go-onger: GinmakuBang!! (2010) – Land Pollution Minister Yogostein
 Gokaiger Goseiger Super Sentai 199 Hero Great Battle (2011) – Revival Crime Minister Yogoshimacritein
 Kaizoku Sentai Gokaiger vs. Space Sheriff Gavan: The Movie (2012) – Land Pollution Minister Yogostein
 Zyuden Sentai Kyoryuger (2013) – Debo Tairyoun (ep. 34)
 Shuriken Sentai Ninninger (2015) –  Western Yokai Franken (ep. 24)
 Uchu Sentai Kyuranger (2017) –  Big Bear (ep. 9 - 10, 25)
 Engine Sentai Go-Onger: 10 Years Grand Prix (2018) - Land Pollution Minister Yogostein

Drama CD

Abunai series 4: Abunai Campus Love – Ryuu Okikura
 Ao no Kiseki series 1: Ao no Kiseki – Lord
 Ao no Kiseki series 2: Catharsis Spell – Lord
 Ao no Kiseki series 3: Crystal Crown – Lord
 Ao no Kiseki series 4: Baroque Pearl – Lord
 Ao no Kiseki series 5: Persona Non Grata – Lord
 Ao no Kiseki series 6: Phantom Pain – Lord
Boxer Wa Inu Ni Naru series 3: Raibaru mo Inu wo Daku – Sakamoto
Ishiguro Kazuomi shi no, Sasayaka na Tanoshimi – Raikou
JoJo's Bizarre Adventure - Jotaro Kujo
Koishikute – Watanabe
Love Mode – Aoe Reiji
Love & Trust – Ryouji Kutsuzawa
Muteki na Anoko – Yasuda
Rolex ni Kuchizukewo – Kunimitsu Yoshida
Workday Warriors - Koi ni Ochite -  – Takeshi Nadaka

Dubbing

Live-action
Bad Company – Jarma (Adoni Maropis)
Batman Begins (2007 NTV edition) – Judge Faden (Gerard Murphy)
Billy Bathgate – Billy Bathgate (Loren Dean)
Carlito's Way – Pachanga (Luis Guzmán)
Jurassic Park – Ray Arnold (Samuel L. Jackson)
Space Jam – Patrick Ewing
Star Wars: Episode I – The Phantom Menace – Captain Panaka (Hugh Quarshie)
Training Day – Moreno (Noel Gugliemi)
X-Men – Logan / Wolverine (Hugh Jackman)

Animated
Aaahh!!! Real Monsters – Elban Bigfoot
Beast Wars – Depth Charge
Bionicle: Mask of Light – Onua
Calling All Engines! – Diesel 10
Teenage Mutant Ninja Turtles – Shredder
Teenage Mutant Ninja Turtles – '87 Shredder

References

External links
Kiyoyuki Yanada at Usagi
 

1965 births
2022 deaths
20th-century Japanese male actors
21st-century Japanese male actors
81 Produce voice actors
Japanese male video game actors
Japanese male voice actors
People from Nerima